Adam Jeffries (born 1976) is an American actor. He is best known for his roles as Lester Freeman on the Fox series True Colors (1990−92) and Jarvis Turrell Jr. on ABC's Thea (1993−94), both of which are sitcoms. Jeffries won two Young Artist Awards during his career.

Early life
Jeffries was born in Tuskegee, Alabama around 1976. He was raised in Atlanta, Georgia. As a child, Jeffries performed in community theater and school productions. In the mid-1980s, he and his mother moved to Los Angeles, California, embarking on an acting career.

Career
Jeffries first began acting in 1989 in the role of Eddie in the educational short film A Nightmare on Drug Street, which was released on VHS as a teaching tool for schools. After appearing in several television series and television movies, Jeffries landed the role of Lester Freeman in the Fox sitcom True Colors, a series about an interracial couple and their children from previous marriages. The creator of the show, Michael J. Weithorn, stated Dulé Hill auditioned for the part, but Jeffries was chosen based on his sense of humor. John J. O'Connor, a reviewer for The New York Times, viewed Jeffries as charming in the role of Lester. He received two consecutive Young Artist Awards for his work in the series. The series was canceled in 1992.

The next year, he portrayed Thea Vidale's oldest son, box boy Jarvis Turrell, Jr., in the short-lived ABC series Thea. Jeffries received his third Young Artist Award nomination, in the category of best ensemble alongside his television siblings. In 1995, he appeared in an episode of The Client, another short-lived series that was based on the 1994 hit film. In it, Jeffries portrayed an expelled student who burned the American flag. Jeffries made guest appearances on Family Matters and The Wonder Years, and had a small role in Ghost Dad (1990), his only role in a feature film.

After his appearance on The Client, Jeffries took a five year hiatus from acting. In 2000, he had a role in the soap opera Days of Our Lives, and guest starred on sitcom Just Shoot Me!. His last acting role was in the 2003 television movie Newton.

Filmography

Awards and nominations

References

External links
 

Place of birth missing (living people)
Living people
African-American male actors
American male child actors
American male film actors
American male television actors
21st-century African-American people
1976 births